Carl Dilena (born 17 March 1967) is a former Australian rules footballer who played with Fitzroy and North Melbourne in the Victorian/Australian Football League (VFL/AFL).

Dilena started his career at South Australian National Football League (SANFL) club Sturt and was involved in a controversial incident late in the 1988 SANFL season when he was knocked unconscious from a charge by Russell Johnston. The Port Adelaide captain was suspended for five weeks and as a result missed playing in their premiership winning team.

He was selected by Fitzroy with the club's first pick, and third overall, in the 1988 VFL Draft. After appearing in the first seven rounds of the 1989 VFL season, he played just four more games for the rest of the year and another 12 in 1990.

North Melbourne then secured Dilena in the 1991 Pre-season draft, with pick 15. He performed well initially and in just his second game for his new club, against Adelaide, Dilena was influential with 39 disposals, with the next best North Melbourne player having just 20 disposals. In 1992, his final season, Dilena played just twice, but put in another good effort against Adelaide when he kicked a career high four goals.

Dilena is currently CEO of the North Melbourne Football Club.

Dilena was also a talented junior cricketer, representing South Australia at the 1981/82 National Under 16 Australian Cricket Championships.

References

Sources
 South Australian Cricket Association (S.A.C.A.) Annual Report 1981-82, S.A.C.A.: Adelaide.

1967 births
Australian rules footballers from South Australia
Fitzroy Football Club players
North Melbourne Football Club players
Sturt Football Club players
Living people